Amundsenia austrocontinentalis is a species of saxicolous (rock-dwelling), crustose lichen in the family Teloschistaceae, and the type species of genus Amundsenia. Found in Antarctica, it was formally described as a new species in 2014 by Isaac Garrido-Benavent, Ulrik Søchting, Sergio Pérez-Ortega, and Rod Seppelt. The type specimen was collected by the last author from Mule Peninsula (Vestfold Hills, Ingrid Christensen Coast), where it was found growing on small stones in glacial till. The species epithet austrocontinentalis refers to its distribution in continental Antarctica.

Description
The colour of the thallus is deep yellow to pale orange, although abraded or dead specimens can become whitish. The apothecia are either lecanorine to zeorine in form, measuring 0.2–1.5 mm wide, with a flat to slightly concave pale orange disc that often has orange pruina. Ascospores number eight per ascus, and are ellipsoid and polardiblastic (pierced by a narrow channel) with dimensions of 8–13.5 by 4.0-6.5 μm.

References

Teloschistales
Lichen species
Lichens described in 2014
Lichens of Antarctica